Umberto Barberis or simply  Berto  (born 5 June 1952 in Sion, Switzerland) is a former Swiss-Italian footballer, last managing Dubai Club.

Playing career
Barberis started his career in Switzerland, playing for FC Sion in his native town, and then for Grasshopper Zurich and Servette FC, winning the Swiss Super League and the Schweizer Cup in 1979. He left his country to play for Division 1 side AS Monaco FC where he was elected foreign player of the year by France Football magazine in 1981 and 1982, along with Andrzej Szarmach. In 1982, he also won the Division 1 title with AS Monaco FC.

International
He was capped 54 times and scored 7 goals.

Personal Honours
 Swiss Footballer of the Year: 1974–75, 1978–79 & 1979–80.
 French Football Foreign Footballer of the Year: 1981 & 1982.
 AS Monaco Club Top Goalscorer: 1982–83.

Trophies
 Swiss Super League Winner: 1979 & 1985.
 Swiss Cup Winner: 1974, 1978, 1979 & 1984.
 Swiss League Cup Winner: 1975, 1977, 1979 & 1980.
 Coppa delle Alpi Winner: 1976, 1978 & 1983.
 Ligue 1 Winner: 1982.
 Coupe de France Winner: 1980.

Coaching career
Barberis coached various Swiss sides such as Lausanne Sports, FC Sion, Servette FC. He formerly coaches Lausanne Sports and joined on 24 December 2008 to Sion as Head Coach from the U-17. On 14 April 2009 FC Sion officials have sacked joint coaches him and Christian Zermatten, a replacement has not been announced yet.

Out of the pitch
Umberto is the father of footballer Sébastien Barberis.

References

External links
 
 Profile
 Monaco Top Goalscorer
 Record of Appearances for Switzerland

1952 births
Living people
People from Sion, Switzerland
Swiss men's footballers
Switzerland international footballers
Swiss Super League players
FC Sion players
Grasshopper Club Zürich players
Servette FC players
Ligue 1 players
AS Monaco FC players
Swiss football managers
FC Lausanne-Sport managers
Servette FC managers
FC Sion managers
Dubai Club managers
Expatriate footballers in Monaco
Swiss expatriate sportspeople in Monaco
Expatriate football managers in Morocco
Swiss expatriate sportspeople in Morocco
Swiss people of Italian descent
Association football wingers
Sportspeople from Valais